Profidia is an extinct genus of leaf beetles in the subfamily Eumolpinae. It contains only one species, Profidia nitida. It is known from Oligo-Miocene amber found near Simojovel in Chiapas, Mexico.

The species was described by American entomologist Judson Linsley Gressitt in 1963, using a single specimen (UCMP 12630) from the collections of the University of California Museum of Paleontology in Berkeley, California.

References

External links
 University of California Museum of Paleontology Specimen 12630

†
†
Prehistoric beetle genera
Mexican amber
Oligocene insects
Miocene insects of North America